Maly Kundysh (Izi Kundyš, literally Little Kundysh) is a river in Mari El, Russia, a left tributary of the Malaya Kokshaga. It is 107 km long, its drainage basin is 1310 km².

References

 Агроклиматический справочник по Марийской АССР, 1961

Rivers of Mari El